Château de Blanquefort is a ruined castle in the commune of Blanquefort in the Gironde département of France.

Description
The castle stands on a spur overlooking the Briolance valley. A classic period dwelling occupies the site though most of the buildings date from the Middle Ages, including a keep and gatehouse (13th century), a gun tower (15th century) and two lowered towers (12th and 13th centuries), incorporated into the house.

The castle is private property. It has been listed since 2008 as a monument historique by the French Ministry of Culture.

References

External links 
 History and photos – Castleland.com

Ruined castles in Nouvelle-Aquitaine
Monuments historiques of Gironde